Delphi Community School Corporation (DCSC) is a school district headquartered in Delphi, Indiana.

Schools
 Delphi Community High School
 Delphi Community Middle School
 Delphi Community Elementary School
 Camden Early Childhood Center

References

External links
 Delphi Community School Corporation

Education in Carroll County, Indiana
School districts in Indiana
Delphi, Indiana